Truncadaphne stonei is a species of sea snail, a marine gastropod mollusk in the family Raphitomidae.

Description
The length of the shell attains 4 mm, its diameter 1.8 mm.

Distribution
This marine species occurred in the Pleistocene off the Galapagos Islands in shallow water.

References

 Hertlein, Leo George, and A. M. Strong. Marine pleistocene mollusks from the Galapagos islands. 1939.
 Finet, Y. (1991) The Marine Mollusks of the Galapagos Islands. In: Galápagos Marine Invertebrate. Taxonomy, Biogeography, and Evolution in Darwin's Islands. Plenum Press. New York and London, p. 253-280.
 Kaiser, K.L. (1997) The recent Molluscan Marine Fauna of the Islas Galápagos. The Festivus, supplement, 9: iii + 67.
 Finet, Y. (2001) The marine mollusks of the Galapagos Islands: a documented faunal list. Editions du Muséum d' Histoire naturelle, Genève, 237 pp

External links
 Gastropods.com: Truncadaphne stonei
 Darwin Foundation: Galapagos Species Checklist

stonei
Gastropods described in 1939